Kémo is one of the 16 prefectures of the Central African Republic. Its capital is Sibut.

Notable people 

 Andrée Blouin, political activist, human rights advocate, and writer

See also 
 Lake Chad replenishment project
 Waterway

References

 
Prefectures of the Central African Republic